Peter Stuart Whish-Wilson (born 24 February 1968) is an Australian politician who has been a Senator for Tasmania since 2012, representing the Australian Greens. Formerly a lecturer in economics at the University of Tasmania, Whish-Wilson was appointed to the Senate to fill a casual vacancy caused by the retirement of former party leader Bob Brown, and has since won election in his own right in 2013, 2016 and 2022.

Education and early career
Whish-Wilson was born in Singapore in 1968 to Australian parents. He attended the Australian Defence Force Academy from 1986 to 1988, where he obtained a Bachelor of Arts degree in Economics and Politics. He also attended Royal Military College, Duntroon in 1989, and was medically discharged from the Australian Army shortly afterwards. From 1991 to 1992, he studied for a Master of Economics degree at the University of Western Australia.

After graduation, he worked for Merrill Lynch in New York and Melbourne, serving as Vice-President from 1994 to 1998. In 1995 he was reported as working for Perth mining stockbroker Saw James.  He then worked in international sales for Deutsche Bank from 1998 to 2004, and as Lecturer in Economics and Finance at the University of Tasmania from 2005 to 2012. He jointly owns Three Wishes Vineyard with his family in the Tamar Valley, Tasmania, serving as its director from 2003 to 2012. His brother is the author David Whish-Wilson.  The Australian classical tubist also named Peter Whish-Wilson is a second cousin.

Political career
Whish-Wilson was chosen by the Parliament of Tasmania under section 15 of the Constitution to represent the State in the Senate in 2012. He was elected Senator for Tasmania in 2013, with his term beginning on 1 July 2014. He was Chair of Committees from 2013 to 2016, and currently holds a number of portfolios for the Australian Greens.

It has been reported that he proposed a national discussion regarding the future of penalty rates which he expanded on in an adjournment speech saying, "I think the big issue is not that penalty rates should be paid—they should, but by whom? Effectively, I do not think small businesses should be the ones paying; rather, consumers should be paying for them."

He currently holds the following portfolios for the Australian Greens: Treasury, Consumer Affairs, Healthy Oceans, Waste and Recycling, and Defence and Veteran's Affairs. He previously held the portfolios of Small Business and Competition Policy, Finance, Tourism, Trade, Marine (Tasmania), Fisheries, Whaling and Antarctica.

References

External links
Peter Whish-Wilson
Peter Whish-Wilson, Greens
Parliamentary biography
Twitter
Facebook
Summary of parliamentary voting for Senator Peter Whish-Wilson on TheyVoteForYou.org.au
Quarterly Essay, September 2016
Huffington Post

1968 births
Australian economists
Australian winemakers
Australian Greens members of the Parliament of Australia
Living people
Members of the Australian Senate
Members of the Australian Senate for Tasmania
Singaporean emigrants to Australia
University of New South Wales alumni
Academic staff of the University of Tasmania
University of Western Australia alumni
21st-century Australian politicians